This is a list of metropolitan areas in the United States and Canada categorized by the number of major professional sports franchises in their metropolitan areas.

Major professional sports leagues

The major professional sports leagues, or simply major leagues, in the United States and Canada are the highest professional competitions of team sports in the two countries. Although individual sports such as golf, mixed martial arts, tennis, and auto racing are also very popular, the term is usually limited to team sports.

The term "major league" was first used in 1921 in reference to Major League Baseball (MLB), the top level of professional American baseball. Today, the major northern North America professional team sports leagues are Major League Baseball (MLB), the National Basketball Association (NBA), the National Football League (NFL) and the National Hockey League (NHL).

These four leagues are also commonly referred to as the Big Four. Each of these is the richest professional club competition in its sport worldwide. The best players can become cultural icons in both countries and elsewhere in the world, because the leagues enjoy a significant place in popular culture in the U.S. and Canada. The NFL and NHL each have 32 teams, and the MLB and the NBA each have 30 teams. The most recent market to receive its first "Big Four" team is Las Vegas, Nevada, which saw the NHL's Vegas Golden Knights make their debut for the 2017–18 season.

Baseball, football and hockey have had professional leagues for over 100 years; early leagues such as the National Association, Ohio League and National Hockey Association formed the basis of the modern MLB, NFL and NHL respectively.  Basketball is a relatively new development; the NBA evolved from the National Basketball League and its splinter group the Basketball Association of America, taking on its current form in 1949.  The fifth biggest professional sports league is Major League Soccer (MLS). While soccer is very popular globally, in Canada and the United States it has struggled to become established with several professional leagues being established and folding before MLS was founded in 1996.  The Canadian Football League (CFL), a much smaller league (9 teams), is also popular in Canada. All of these leagues draw 15,000 or more fans in attendance per game on average as of 2015. Therefore, this list includes a ranking by teams in the Big Four (B4), the Big Five (B5), and a separate ranking also including teams in the CFL called the Big Six (B6).

Metropolitan area

Though teams are listed here by metropolitan area, the distribution and support of teams within an area can reveal regional fractures below that level, whether by neighborhood, rival cities within a media market or separate markets entirely. Baseball teams provide illustrations for several of these models. In New York City, the Yankees are popularly dubbed the "Bronx Bombers" for their home borough and generally command the loyalties of fans from the Bronx, parts of Brooklyn, Staten Island, Manhattan, Long Island, parts of North Jersey and Westchester County, New York, while the Mets play in Queens and draw support from Queens, Brooklyn and parts of Long Island, revealing a split by neighborhood. The San Francisco Giants and Oakland Athletics represent rival cities within the Bay Area, a single media market. Though the Washington Nationals and Baltimore Orioles share a metro area, their cities anchor separate media markets and hold distinctly separate cultural identities. In Los Angeles, the Lakers and Clippers share an arena (Staples Center) and media coverage is split amongst different broadcasters in the metro area.

With the Vegas Golden Knights, based in the Las Vegas Valley, the 23rd largest market in North America, having joined the National Hockey League in 2017, the largest urban areas without a team in one of the big four leagues are the 30th-ranked Austin region (though it does have a Major League Soccer team as of 2021) and the 37th-ranked Virginia Beach-Norfolk region. The smallest metropolitan area to have a Big Four team is Green Bay (Green Bay Packers), which is the 146th largest metropolitan area, though much of its fan base is drawn from Milwaukee, which is 120 miles away and the 38th largest market. The smallest stand-alone metropolitan area to have a Big Four team is the 78th-largest market, Winnipeg (Winnipeg Jets), while Buffalo, NY, is the smallest metropolitan area to have more than one Big Four teams (Buffalo Bills and Buffalo Sabres).

Foxboro, Massachusetts, population 16,685 as of the 2010 Census, is a small town which hosts two major-league teams (the New England Patriots and the New England Revolution). Foxboro is considered part of the Boston metropolitan area, even though it is slightly closer to Providence, Rhode Island. In a comparable situation, the even smaller town of East Rutherford, New Jersey, population 8,913, hosts the New York Giants and New York Jets; the city of Newark, New Jersey previously hosted the now-Brooklyn Nets, New Jersey Devils and now-New York Red Bulls. Newark and East Rutherford, although both places are in New Jersey, is part of the New York City metropolitan area.

Teams by metropolitan area
The following list contains all metropolitan areas in the United States and Canada containing at least one team in any of the six major leagues. The number of teams in the big four leagues (B4) and the big six leagues (B6), and the city's teams in the National Football League (NFL), Major League Baseball (MLB), the National Basketball Association (NBA), the National Hockey League (NHL), Major League Soccer (MLS) and the Canadian Football League (CFL). No metropolitan area has teams in all six leagues, as NFL teams are exclusively in the United States and CFL teams are exclusively in Canada.

Notes

Teams by state/province/territory
The number of Big Six teams based on their home state is shown in the map below:

The number of Big Six teams based on their home state/province/territory is shown in the map below:

Notes

See also
U.S. cities with teams from four major league sports
List of auto racing tracks in the United States by city
List of professional golf tournaments in the United States by city
List of professional sports teams in the United States and Canada
Major professional sports leagues in the United States and Canada
Major professional sports teams of the United States and Canada
List of top level minor league sports teams in the United States by city
List of soccer clubs in the United States by city

References

External links
North American Pro Sports Teams – Lists every league that has operated in Canada and/or the United States. Grouped by city.

Franchises
Sport in Canada by city
Cities
Cities
Cities
Cities
Cities
Cities
Professional sports leagues in the United States
Professional sports leagues in Canada